Brink! is a 1998 Disney Channel Original Movie that depicts the sport of aggressive inline skating. Written by Jeff Schechter and directed by Greg Beeman, the film stars Erik von Detten as Andy "Brink" Brinker, a high school inline skater who joins a group of skaters to help his financially troubled family. The plot adapts and updates the 1865 novel Hans Brinker, or The Silver Skates by Mary Mapes Dodge. The film was released as the third Disney Channel Original Movie.

Plot
Andy "Brink" Brinker and his in-line skating crew—Peter, Jordy, and Gabriella—who call themselves "Soul-Skaters" (they skate for the fun of it, not for the money), clash with a semi-professional skating team, Team X-Bladz—led by Val—with whom they attend high school in southern California.

On the first day of school, the Soul-Skaters and Team X-Bladz race on school grounds. Boomer, a skater for Team X-Bladz, is seriously injured during the race, causing Brink to stop mid-race to help him.  Brink and the other racers are caught and suspended. Brink learns that his family is in financial trouble; his father, Ralph, has been on disability for six months and is unsure if he will get his job back when he’s well. Brink secretly goes against what he believes and joins Team X-Bladz for $200 a week, as a replacement for Boomer. Ralph didn’t want Brink to spend even more time skating so he forbade Brink from taking the job. However, Brink disobeys him. Ralph being unaware that Brink took the job and since Brink had said he wanted to work, Ralph gets him a part-time job at Pup-N-Suds, a dog grooming business. This, however, is a job which Jordy, Gabriella, and Peter are aware of because Brink had told them that he's working there. For a while, Brink manages to keep his other job in Team X-Bladz a secret from his family and friends by juggling school, both jobs, and practice with the Soul-Skaters. However, Jordy, Gabriella, and Peter discover the truth when they catch him skating for Team X-Bladz at an invitational prior to an upcoming local competition. Brink's friends feel he betrayed them and choose to ignore him upon discovering his alignment with Team X-Bladz.

Brink tries to rejoin the Soul Skaters, but is rebuffed. Val offers Brink a chance to re-join X-Bladz by noting the team won't hold him leaving against him. While scouting the route for the downhill leg of the upcoming competition, The Soul-Skaters and Team X-Bladz agree to a downhill race, with Gabriella against Brink. During the race, Val sabotages the course by tossing gravel onto the road - but tells Brink to take a different route. Gabriella wipes out big and sustains cuts and bruises. Brink realizes what Val did.

Brink visits Gabriella at her house and she calls him a sell-out. Ralph learns about the accident from Gabriella's mother and Brink confesses that he took the job with X-Bladz even though he was told not to. Ralph has a heart-to-heart with Brink and asks him why he didn't tell the family about it. Brink finally confesses his true reasons for joining Team X-Bladz and wanting to be a somebody from it. He admits that though he got what he wanted, it has gotten him into a mess. Brink mentions he has lost his friends and doesn't have fun skating with X-Bladz. Ralph reveals that although the family is in financial trouble, Brink should not be skating for the money and would rather skate for fun.

Inspired by his father, Brink confronts Val at the local boardwalk, quits Team X-Bladz, and returns the team gear (skates / helmet). Val tells Brink to not renege on his contractual obligations with Team X-Bladz. This leads to a heated argument between both boys and Brink to toss a milkshake in Val's face.

In the days before the competition, Brink meets his friends at the skate yard. After giving them new skates, Brink tells them of his plan to sponsor the team under the name "Team Pup 'N Suds". When questioned, Brink admits he got an advance from PupNSuds from his wages to pay for the skates. They forgive Brink and accept him as their friend again.

As friends once again, they compete in the competition with their families' support. In the end, it comes down to Brink and Val in the championship race. Throughout the downhill championship, Val continually attempts to shove Brink off the course. When Val crashes off the course, Brink returns to help him up. Val yanks Brink to the ground to try to get a head start, while ESPN cameras stream the interaction to onlookers. After getting up, with Val in the lead, Brink takes a shortcut to win the race.

Immediately after the race, while Val storms off, Team X-Bladz manager, Jimmy, who saw Val's cheating and kicked him off the team, offers Brink a spot on Team X-Bladz. However, Brink declines. He happily re-joins the Soul Skaters and receives the trophy.

Cast
 Erik von Detten as Andy "Brink" Brinker
 Sam Horrigan as Val Horrigan
 Christina Vidal as Gabriella Dellama
 Robin Riker as Maddie Brinker
 Geoffrey Blake as Jimmy
 Patrick Levis as Peter Calhoun
 Joey Simmrin as Arne "Worm"
 Asher Gold as Jordy
 Walter Emanuel Jones as "Boomer"
 Katie Volding as Kate Brinker
 David Graf as Ralph Brinker
 Kevin Clifford as Garbage Man

Soundtracks
Original music composed by J. Peter Robinson, additional music by Phil Marshall
 "Give" by The Suicide Machines
 "Sooner or Later" by Fastball
 "Apology" by Clarissa
 "Come on Brink" by Mark Mason and Rick Allen

Reception
In 2012, Complex ranked the film at number 1 on the magazine's list of the 25 best Disney Channel Original Movies (DCOMs). In December 2015, Dylan Kickham of Entertainment Weekly ranked Brink! at number four on a list of the top 30 DCOMs. Kickham wrote, "Along with the hilariously nostalgic lingo, Brink! earns its place in the pantheon of great DCOMs for mixing adrenaline, drama, and one-time Disney golden boy Erik von Detten." In March 2016, the film was ranked at number 37 on MTV's list of the best DCOMs, consisting of 99 films. In May 2016, Aubrey Page of Collider ranked each Disney Channel Original Movie released up to that point. Page ranked Brink! at number 17, writing, "It's been official pretty much since it aired: Brink! is a classic. And, it's potentially the best aggressive inline skating movie ever been committed to film – though it might also be the only one."

References

External links

1998 television films
1998 films
American teen drama films
Disney Channel Original Movie films
Roller skating films
Sports television films
Films directed by Greg Beeman
American drama television films
1990s American films